Joseph Finnegan may refer to:
 Joseph Finegan (1814–1885), sometimes Finnegan, American businessman and general
 Joseph Finnegan (judge) (born 1942), judge of the Supreme Court of Ireland
 Joseph Finnegan (cryptographer) (1905–1980), American linguist and cryptographer
 Joseph F. Finnegan (1904–1964), American labor mediator